The Star Awards for Unforgettable Villain was an award presented annually at the Star Awards, a ceremony that was established in 1994.

The category was introduced in 2010, at the 16th Star Awards ceremony. It was given in honour of an actor or actress who portrayed a drama series villain that is deemed the most unforgettable among the television audience. The nominees were determined by a team of judges employed by MediaCorp; winners were selected by a majority vote from the public via online voting.

Brandon Wong is the recent winner in this category for his role in Recipe of Life.

The award was only given out in 2010 and was replaced by the Favourite Onscreen Couple (Drama) and Favourite Onscreen Partners (Variety) awards in the following year.

Recipient

 Year is linked to the article about the Star Awards held that year.

References

External links 

Star Awards